Millen is an unincorporated community in Hampshire County, West Virginia, United States between Donaldson and Green Spring on Green Spring Road (West Virginia Secondary Route 1) and the South Branch Valley Railroad. Millen is nestled in Green Spring Valley along Green Spring Run between Green Spring Ridge (881 feet) and Valley Mountain (1,437 feet).

Church 
Forest Glen United Methodist Church, Green Spring Road (CR 1)

References 

Unincorporated communities in Hampshire County, West Virginia
Unincorporated communities in West Virginia